The Ozurgeti uezd was a county (uezd) of the Kutaisi Governorate of the Caucasus Viceroyalty of the Russian Empire. It bordered the Senaki uezd to the north, the Kutaisi uezd to the east, the Akhaltsikhe uezd of the Tiflis Governorate to the southeast, the Batum Okrug of the Batum Oblast to the south, and the Black Sea to the west. The area of the Ozurgeti uezd corresponded to most of the contemporary Guria region of Georgia. The county was eponymously named for its administrative center, Ozurgeti.

History 
The Ozurgeti uezd was formed in 1846 as part of the Kutaisi Governorate during the time of the Russian Empire. In 1918, the Kutaisi Governorate including the Ozurgeti uezd was incorporated into the Democratic Republic of Georgia.

Administrative divisions 
The subcounties (uchastoks) of the Ozurgeti uezd in 1913 were as follows:

Demographics

Russian Empire Census 
The majority of the population indicated Georgian to be their mother tongue, with a significant Greek speaking minority.

Kavkazskiy kalendar 

Notes

References

Bibliography 

1840s establishments in Georgia (country)
1846 establishments in the Russian Empire
Caucasus Viceroyalty (1801–1917)
1910s disestablishments in Georgia (country)
Kutaisi Governorate
Modern history of Georgia (country)
States and territories established in 1846
States and territories disestablished in 1918
Uezds of Kutaisi Governorate